The Swan Baronetcy, of Southfleet in the County of Kent, was a title in the Baronetage of England. It was created on 1 March 1666 for William Swan. The title became extinct on the death of the second Baronet in 1712.

Swan baronets, of Southfleet (1666)

Sir William Swan, 1st Baronet (1631–1680)
Sir William Swan, 2nd Baronet (1667–1712)

See also
Swann baronets

References

Extinct baronetcies in the Baronetage of England
1666 establishments in England